Blue Whale is a 2019 drama mystery series directed by Fereydoun Jeyrani, written by Bahram Tavakoli and produced by Saeid Malekan. This series is in an adventurous atmosphere in Persian and a product of Iran. In addition to Saeid Malekan, Honar Aval and Filimo companies are also investors in the series. The series named after the Blue Whale Challenge.

Plot
"Armin" (Saed Soheili), a young 25-year-old computer savvy student, is unable to communicate with people and spend most of his time with his own book-reading website. His father (Majid Mozaffari) is suffering from MS and has been separated from his mother (Parivash Nazarieh). She meets a girl on the reading website, "Jaleh" (Mahoor Alvand), whose list of favorite books is very similar to Armin's. Jaleh, who has financial difficulties, introduces him to work at a company where she works as a graphic artist. Armin in the company, meet "Bahman" (Hossein Yari) Branch Chief, "Anahita" (Leila Hatami) Bahman's nominee, Haleh (Azadeh Samadi) Company Secretary, "Nader" (Hamid Reza Azarang) board member of the main company, and "Morvarid" (Vishka Asayesh) Nader's wife and another board member of the main company. Armin is hired as the network security officer at the company and this is the start of his new life.

Cast

References

External links

Iranian drama television series
2019 Iranian television series debuts